The Speaker of the Hawaii House of Representatives is the speaker (presiding officer) of the Hawaii House of Representatives.

Territorial House of Representatives

After statehood

References

 

 

Speaker
Hawaii